The Fake EP is the debut release from Christian recording artist Joy Whitlock. It was released on Ardent Records on November 11, 2005. The album received positive reviews. The EP contains 5 original songs written by Whitlock ("Colors" by Whitlock and Drew Thomas) shortly after her conversion, dealing heavily with themes of redemption and the difficult struggles of being a Christian.

Track listing
 "Cost of Being Free" - 4:38
 "Don't Look Down" - 5:00
 "Traces of You" - 6:34
 "Fake" - 4:32
 "Colors" - 3:49

Production
 Jeff Powell - Producer, Engineer, Mixing
 Adam Hill - Additional Engineering
 Erik Flettrich - Additional Engineering
 Ardent Studios - Recording Location, Mixing Location
 Kevin Nix - Mastering

Musicians
 Ken Coomer - drums
 Derek Shipley - bass guitar
 Steve Selvidge - electric guitar
 Joy Whitlock - acoustic guitar, background vocals
 Rick Steff - B-3 organ, mellotron
 James Joseph - additional keys
 Jonathan Kirkscey - cello
 Susan Marshall - background vocals
 Jackie Johnson - background vocals

References

External links
 The Fake EP at Amazon.com

Joy Whitlock albums
2005 debut EPs
Ardent Records albums